Lévai, Levai,  Levaï, Lévay or Levay is a Hungarian Jewish surname, originating from the Israelite surnames Levi and Levy.

It may refer to:
István Lévai (boxer) (born 1957), Hungarian boxer
Ivan Levaï (born 1937), Hungarian-French journalist
Katalin Lévai (born 1954), Hungarian politician
Nick Levay (1977–2021), American computer security expert
Simon LeVay (born 1943), British-American neuroscientist
Sylvester Levay (born 1945), Hungarian composer
Vivien Lévai (born 1992), Hungarian volleyball player
Anikó Lévai (born 1963), wife of Hungarian Prime Minister
Mag. Laurin Levai (born 1983), Ante Portas / Sozialarbeiter

History 

The surname Lévai is a Jewish surname, which was created by the modification of the original Jewish name of Levi (surname) or Levy (surname). The name's bearers today are of Jewish Descent. During World War II, the time of The Holocaust, the name Lévai/Lévay was a name very much preferred by the Hungarian Jewish population to change their names to – in order to try to evade persecution.

See also
Lévay József Református Gimnázium és Diákotthon, a school in Hungary

References

Hungarian-language surnames
Levite surnames
Jews and Judaism in Hungary